Pyroclasts is the ninth studio album by drone metal band Sunn O))). The album was released through Southern Lord Records on October 25, 2019. Pyroclasts was recorded and mixed by Steve Albini (Nirvana, Neurosis, Godspeed You! Black Emperor) entirely using analog tape. In addition to Greg Anderson and Stephen O'Malley, the album features collaborators Tos Nieuwenhuizen, Tim Midyett and Hildur Guðnadóttir.

Pyroclasts was written and recorded alongside what has been described as a "sister album" or a "fraternal twin" album titled Life Metal that was released six months earlier on April 26, 2019. Sunn O))) plus additional collaborators live recorded a new 11-minute improvised drone session at the start or end of each day during the recording of Life Metal. Pyroclasts is a collection of four of those tracks. The title refers to volcanic airborne pyroclastic rock.

Critical reception

Upon its release, Pyroclasts received positive reviews from contemporary music critics. At Metacritic, which assigns a normalized rating out of 100 to reviews from mainstream publications, Pyroclasts received an average score of 74, based on ten reviews, indicating "generally favorable reviews." In the review for AllMusic, Thom Jurek wrote that "The forward evolution of Life Metal has been balanced and extended into a mercurial spirit through formless, receptive interaction on Pyroclasts."

Jason Anderson of Uncut praised the album, writing that "The results may comprise the most finely distilled example of Stephen O'Malley and Greg Anderson's deconstruction of heavy metal riffage, with each of these tracks demonstrating the infinite varieties of fuzz and rumble that exist within a single mighty note."

Classic Rock gave the album a 3/10 score, writing, "Four 11-minute 'improvised modal drones' recorded by Steve Albini during the Life Metal sessions for which we're supposed to be grateful. This is why punk happened. Get a grip."

Track listing

Personnel
Pyroclasts personnel adapted from LP liner notes.

Sunn O)))
 Greg Anderson – electric guitar
 Stephen O'Malley – electric guitar, electric bass guitar

Additional musicians
 Hildur Guðnadóttir – electric cello, haldorophone
 Tim Midyett – electric baritone guitar
 Tos Nieuwenhuizen – Moog Rogue synthesizer

Production
 Steve Albini – recording, mixing (at Electrical Audio in July 2018)
 Greg Anderson – production
 Matt Colton – mastering (at Metropolis, London in July 2019)
 Stephen O'Malley – production

Artwork and design
 Samantha Keely Smith – paintings

References

External links
Pyroclasts on Bandcamp

2019 albums
Sunn O))) albums
Southern Lord Records albums